= Fort of Budhayan =

Fort in Uttar Pradesh, India

The Fort of Budhayan is a location in the war of the Indian Rebellion of 1857.
